Borek Zakouřil (born 11 November 1976) is a Czech alpine skier. He competed at the 2002 Winter Olympics and the 2006 Winter Olympics.

References

1976 births
Living people
Czech male alpine skiers
Olympic alpine skiers of the Czech Republic
Alpine skiers at the 2002 Winter Olympics
Alpine skiers at the 2006 Winter Olympics
Sportspeople from Liberec